King Island Roxystars Recordings AB, more known as Roxy Recordings, or Roxy is an independent record label based in Kungsholmen, Stockholm, Sweden where their office is the former site of Cheiron Studios and its successor The Location. It was bought by Universal Music Group in August 2011. The label was formed in 2007 and is owned by Playground Music Scandinavia . The label is mostly active on the Swedish market, but with former signed artists such as Agnes Carlsson and Erik Hassle, they have made an international leap. Agnes was the first one out, selling almost one million copies of her international hit single "Release Me" in 2009 and being released under Roxy's licence in 35 countries. Erik Hassle was successful with his hit "Hurtful" in among others, the UK. Victor Finke, also known under his stage name DEEVA, had a streaming hit with "Space Dance".

Universal put Roxy up for sale in September 2012; the founders bought the label becoming the owners. The label is now owned by Playground Music.

Artists signed by Roxy Recordings
Tjuvjakt
Crew of Me&You
RABBII
E.A. Lundquist
Orup
Finess
Allysandra
Fungz
Pidde P
Olle Grafström
Lena Philipsson
Malena Ernman
Julia Bergwall
Sarah Dawn Finer
The Lovers of Valdaro (duo)

Former signed artists 

 Agnes Carlsson
 Eric Saade
 Amanda Fondell
 Anton Ewald
 Sebastian Karlsson 
 Patrik Isaksson
 Peter Jöback
 Le Kid
 Lucia Pinéra
 Victor Finke (as DEEVA) (single: Space Dance)
 The Ark 
 Sara Varga
 Janet Leon
 Eric Gadd
 Nicole Sabouné
 Fawni
 Erik Hassle
 Thomas Stenström

See also 
 List of record labels

References

External links
 Official site

Swedish independent record labels
Record labels established in 2007
Swedish companies established in 2007
Companies based in Stockholm